Jandaha Assembly constituency was an assembly constituency in Vaishali district in the Indian state of Bihar.

Overview
As a consequence of the orders of the Delimitation Commission of India, Jandaha Assembly constituency emerged in 1962 and ceased to exist in 2010.

It was part of Hajipur Lok Sabha constituency.

Election results 1962 -2010

1977-2010
List of MLAs of Jandaha Vidhan Sabha Constituency is as follows:

References

Former assembly constituencies of Bihar
Politics of Vaishali district